Drown is the semi-autobiographical, debut short story collection from Dominican-American author Junot Díaz that address the trials of Dominican immigrants as they attempt to find some semblance of the American Dream after immigrating to America. The stories are set in the context of 1980s America, and are narrated by an adult who is looking back at his childhood. Drown was published by Riverhead Books in 1996.

Drown precedes his novel The Brief Wondrous Life of Oscar Wao, which won the 2008 Pulitzer Prize for Fiction, and the short story collection This Is How You Lose Her. Drown is dedicated to his mother, Virtudes Díaz.

Background
Díaz was born in the Dominican Republic and came with his family to New Jersey when he was a young boy. When asked if he remembers the experience, he says: "If I burn your entire country down, would you remember being six or seven? There is nothing like the trauma of losing one's country and gaining another. It makes recollection very, very sharp." Díaz's father came to the U.S. first, got a job at a Reynolds aluminum warehouse in Elizabeth, N.J., and Díaz, his mother, and four siblings followed five years later in 1974. The people living in his neighborhood, Díaz says, were "colorful, poor, working, and transitional," and the area itself was "no joke," but his family was "already accustomed to a very rough-and-tumble upbringing." Of himself, Díaz says, "I was a child. I didn't speak English, and I experienced the competitiveness of America, and it's a profoundly cruel childhood culture.”

Díaz attended Kean College in Union, New Jersey for one year before transferring and ultimately completing his B.A. at Rutgers University in 1992. Yunior would become central to much of Díaz's work and Díaz would later explain: "My idea, ever since Drown, was to write six or seven books about him that would form one big novel." He earned his MFA from Cornell University in 1995, where he wrote most of his first collection of short stories.

As David Gates wrote in his The New York Times review of Drown: "In five of these ten stories, his narrator is young Ramon de las Casas, called Yunior, whose father abandons his wife and children for years before returning to the Dominican Republic and bringing them back with him to New Jersey. In other stories, the nameless tellers may or may not be Yunior, but they're all young Latino men with the same well-defended sensitivity, uneasy relations with women and obsessive watchfulness."

Contents

Synopsis

"Ysrael" 
This story was included in The Best American Short Stories, 1996. "Ysrael" tells the story of Yunior and his brother Rafa in the Dominican Republic searching for a neighborhood boy whose face was disfigured by a pig, causing him to wear a mask at all times.

"Fiesta, 1980" 
This story is mostly about the narrator's father, a party at his aunt and uncle's, and his father's relationship with "the Puerto Rican woman".

"Aurora"
This story discusses Lucero's life as a drug dealer and his romantic relationship with a heroin addict. Here, he dreams of having a normal life with Aurora, but her addiction presents major obstacles. This story focuses on the idea of love as something difficult to define. While the narrator hopes to have a normal relationship with Aurora, any semblance of normalcy is threatened by the characters' dangerous lifestyles.

"Aguantando" 
Yunior tells a series of anecdotes about his time living in Santo Domingo and his anticipation to hear from his father, who has left for the United States.

"Drown" 
This story describes the narrator's alienation from a friend visiting from college. He retraces the final summer they spent together and the sexual experiences they had that the narrator is confused by. Often times the audience is left feeling contempt for the main character finding themselves indifferent about his self inflicted state of decay.

"Boyfriend"
The story focuses on the narrator overhearing the ups and downs of a relationship between his two neighbors through the walls, and hoping to build up the courage to speak to the woman.

"Edison, New Jersey"
This story details the narrator's time as a pool table delivery man with his partner Wayne, as well as the end of a romantic relationship between the narrator and his girlfriend.

"How to Date a Browngirl, Blackgirl, Whitegirl, or Halfie"
The story takes the guise of an instructional manual, purporting to offer advice as to how to act or behave depending upon the ethnicity and social class of the reader’s date.

"No Face"
This story tells of Ysrael from his own perspective and his anticipation regarding facial reconstruction surgery by Canadian doctors.

"Negocios"
This story explains Yunior's father Ramon's arrival to the United States, first to Miami and then New York. Ramon struggles both financially and with the guilt of having left his family behind after he marries an American to obtain citizenship.

Major Themes

The American Dream 
The book centers around an immigrant family from the Dominican Republic. First, Ramon comes to the United States searching for a better life for his family. He is often frustrated by how hard he works with little return and little wealth to show for it. Then, when his family joins him, they too try to find some balance between the American Dream and their reality. Ramon’s dream was to own his own business and provide for his family, which he achieves to a certain degree. But is doesn’t make him better or happier.

Community 
In both Santo Domingo and in New York, Diaz portrays tight-knit communities that are bound together by heritage and social class.

Family 
Drown is about a family that is forced to separate in order to immigrate to the U.S. and the strain that separation evokes as well as the irreparable damage their father creates by being unfaithful to his wife and abusive to his children.

Sexuality 
Both Rafa and his father are with several women throughout the book and explore their sexuality outside of committed relationships. Yunior, however, struggles more with his sexuality and while he has a girlfriend at several points in the book, he also has a sexual experience with a man. In a conversation with Hilton Als, Junot explains that he is confounded by how little attention is paid to the homosexual experiences in this narrative when critics talk about the fictive world of Yunior De las Casas because it's fundamental to who he is as a character.

Major Characters
Ramon de las Casas or “Yunior”- An immigrant from the Dominican Republic and often the main character and narrator of the stories.
Rafa- Yunior’s older brother who he has a complicated and sometimes belligerent relationship with.
Madai- The younger sister of Yunior and Rafa.
Virta- Yunior’s mother and wife of Ramon. She is seen as very beautiful and works in a chocolate factory to provide for her children while Ramon is living in the U.S.
Ramón- Father of Yunior, Rafa and Madai. Ramon leaves his family in Santo Domingo to travel to the U.S. and gain citizenship in order for them to join him. Though, once he arrives in U.S., he marries someone else and tries to forget about his family, he eventually brings them over. Ramon is seen often cheating on his wife and abusing his children.
Nilda- Ramon’s wife whom he marries in the U.S. to gain citizenship.

Reception
Drown was nominated for the 1997 Quality Paperback Book "New Voices award and "Ysrael and “Fiesta, 1980” were included in Best American Short Stories 1996 and 1997.

Gates writes of Díaz's characters: "Mainstream American literature from William Bradford to Toni Morrison has always been obsessed with outsiders; its Hucks and Holdens are forever duking it out with the King's English, and writers as different as Ezra Pound, Zora Neale Hurston and Donald Barthelme have delighted in defiling the pure well with highbrow imports, nonstandard vernacular and Rube Goldberg coinages. Despite his professed discomfort, Mr. Díaz is smart enough to play his hand for all it's worth." He also compares Díaz to Raymond Carver, writing: "Mr. Diaz transfigures disorder and disorientation with a rigorous sense of form. He whips story after story into shape by setting up parallel scenes."

The San Francisco Chronicle described Drown: "This stunning collection of stories offers an unsentimental glimpse of life among the immigrants from the Dominican Republic—and other front-line reports on the ambivalent promise of the American dream—by an eloquent and original writer who describes more than physical dislocation in conveying the price that is paid for leaving culture and homeland behind."

References

1996 short story collections
Hispanic and Latino American short story collections
Works by Junot Díaz
Riverhead Books books